This is a list of defunct airlines of Serbia.

See also
 List of airlines of Serbia
 List of airports in Serbia
 List of airlines of Yugoslavia

References

Serbia
Airlines
Airlines, defunct